Mervin Stephen Glennie (23 September 1918 — 16 January 1986) was an English first-class cricketer and a businessperson in the oil industry.

Glennie was born in France at Tours in September 1918. He was educated at Sherborne School, before going up to Caius College, Cambridge. A member of the Cambridge University Cricket Club, Glennie made two first-class appearances for the club in 1937 against Northamptonshire and Middlesex. Following the Second World War, Glennie made a single first-class appearance for the Marylebone Cricket Club against Oxford University at Lord's. A wicket-keeper, he took two catches and stumpings in his three matches. He was involved in the oil industry, where he was a manager for BP and the Iranian Oil Consortium. Glennie died in January 1986 at Monken Hadley Common in Hertfordshire.

References

External links

1918 births
1986 deaths
Sportspeople from Tours, France
People educated at Sherborne School
Alumni of Gonville and Caius College, Cambridge
English cricketers
Cambridge University cricketers
Marylebone Cricket Club cricketers
BP people